Dong Myong-chol is a North Korean former footballer. He represented North Korea on at least one occasion in 1988.

Career statistics

International

International goals
Scores and results list North Korea's goal tally first, score column indicates score after each North Korea goal.

References

Date of birth unknown
Living people
North Korean footballers
North Korea international footballers
Association footballers not categorized by position
Year of birth missing (living people)